Devamangalam is a village in the Udayarpalayam taluk of Ariyalur district, Tamil Nadu, India.

This place surrounded by many small ponds which stores rain water and gives water to the village and to the underground, all depends on the rain.

Demographics 

As per the 2001 census, Devamangalam had a total population of 3137 with 1578 males and 1559 females.

References 

Villages in Ariyalur district